Calhoun County Airport  is a public airport  northwest of Blountstown in Calhoun County, Florida. It is on State Road 71 between Blountstown, FL and Altha, FL and is publicly owned.

References

External links

Airports in Florida
Transportation buildings and structures in Calhoun County, Florida